Idem Pellam Baboi is a 1990 Telugu-language comedy film produced by B. H. Rajanna under the Raja Enterprises banner and directed by Kaatragadda Ravi Teja. It stars Rajendra Prasad and Raadhika, with music composed by Ilaiyaraaja. It is a remake of the Tamil film Manamagale Vaa (1988) and became a box office failure.

Plot
Shoba Devi (P. R. Varalakshmi) is a very proud arrogant woman who treats her elder daughter-in-law Aruna (Rajyalakshmi) like a slave and sends her out of the house for violating her orders. Aruna's younger sister Jhansi (Radhika) returns home after completing her studies when she learns about her sister's problem. Now she decides to set-right her sister's life. So, she plans to marry Shoba Devi's younger son Kalyan Chakravarthy (Rajendra Prasad), to enter their house. Jhansi understands that Kalyan wants to marry an innocent village girl when she changes her attire, reaches their village and marries Kalyan. Rest of the story is a comic tale that how Jhansi teaches a lesson to Shoba Devi.

Cast

Rajendra Prasad as Kalyana Chakravarthy
Raadhika as Jhansi / Rajamma
Gollapudi Maruti Rao as Chi Chi Swamy
Kota Srinivasa Rao as Dasharatharamaiah
Brahmanandam as Kalyan's friend
Sudhakar as Sridhar
Rallapalli  as Nagiri Pengiri Hanumanthu 
Sakshi Ranga Rao as Raja Shekaram
Kaasi Viswanath as Abbulu
Sivaji Raja as Bulli Babu
Chitti Babu as Kalyan's friend
K. K. Sarma as John Masthan Subramanya Sastry
Badi Tataji
Satti Babu as Pratapa Simha Maharaju
Juttu Narasimham as Kannaiah
Dham as Sadajapa
Suryakantam as Ramulamma 
P. R. Varalakshmi as Shobha Devi
Rajyalakshmi as Aruna
Mamatha as Doctor
Chankrika as Perantallu

Soundtrack

Music composed by Ilaiyaraaja. Music released on ECHO Audio Company.

Other
 VCDs and DVDs on - HYDERABAD Video Company, Hyderabad

References

Indian comedy films
1980s Telugu-language films
Telugu remakes of Tamil films
Films scored by Ilaiyaraaja